The Star Wolf is a series of science fiction novels by American writer David Gerrold, centered on the star ship Star Wolf and its crew. The Star Wolf is a "Liberty Ship", officially designated the LS-1187. Plagued by misfortune throughout the series, without any confirmed kills to its credit, it was denied a name by Command.

Antagonists 
The main antagonists are the members of the Morthan Solidarity, originally a group of genetically improved humans.

"Voyage..." explains that while a rational mind would have tried to improve rationality in genetic modifications, humans improved self-preservation and physical attributes. Sociologically, they were educated not to be a subspecies, but a superspecies of humanity. Their name is a neologism from "more-than". 1,500 years prior to "Voyage of the Star Wolf", the most aggressive and highly evolved Morthans broke away from the human sphere and invented a highly ritualised culture far from human-inhabited space, genetically improving every generation in comparison to the last. It is rumoured in "Voyage..." that reproduction is exclusively through artificial wombs; as the Morthans are said to waste nothing and allocate resources to maximum effect, it is speculated that Morthans would consider it wasteful to breed a woman when for the same investment, they could also get a full warrior.

A full-blown war erupts in the course of "Voyage of the Star Wolf", as the Morthan Solidarity starts an offensive against the Terran Alliance.

Tie-in to other books by Gerrold 
The central computer of every Liberty ship is a H.A.R.L.I.E. sentient computer as described in When HARLIE Was One.

The Chtorrans from The War Against the Chtorr are mentioned at least once in "Voyage of the Star Wolf", possibly setting it into a "space age"-future some 2,000 years after the war against the Chtorr.

A Tribble is mentioned as a source of a "fluctuator" malfunction and it is stated that in Med, the medic has a cage full of them.

Books
 Voyage of the Star Wolf (1990)
 The Middle of Nowhere (1995)
 Blood and Fire (2004), which is a rewrite of a planned Star Trek: The Next Generation script featuring gay characters and an AIDS metaphor.  The novel contains several slams against the Star Trek franchise, such as stating how another starship nicknamed "Big E" (the US Navy's unofficial nickname for the Enterprise) was too valuable in terms of propaganda to risk on the front lines, and a dead crewmember named "M. Okuda."
 Yesterday's Children (1972), later significantly expanded and republished as Starhunt (1985). It occurs prior to the other novels in the series' main continuity, but is not perfectly consistent with them.

Gerrold had planned to develop this concept into a TV series, as he writes in an introduction to Voyage of the Star Wolf. The later novels were written after the TV concept had been presented.  The Star Wolf series reflects Gerrold's contention that, due to the distances involved, space battles would be more like submarine hunts than the dogfights usually portrayed—in most cases the ships doing battle wouldn't even be able to see each other. Gerrold referred to the concept as "World War II in space," and intended it as a stylistic opposite of Star Trek (particularly its Next Generation incarnation) by setting the main characters on a small, dingy spacecraft that had little respect in the fleet rather than on the flagship. His inability to sell the concept as a television project led to the book series.

In spite of the strong contrast between the Starwolf series and Star Trek, the original germ of "Yesterday's Children" was in the framing story of Gerrold's early proposed 2-part Star Trek episode "Tomorrow Was Yesterday". The central story, without the frame, eventually became Gerrold's Star Trek novel The Galactic Whirlpool.

External links
 

Science fiction novel series
Military science fiction novels